William the Simple ( – c. 1150) was Count of Blois and Count of Chartres from 1102 to 1107, and jure uxoris Count of Sully.

Biography
William was the eldest son of Stephen, Count of Blois and Adela of Normandy, daughter of William the Conqueror. William was the older brother of Theobald II, Count of Champagne; Stephen, King of England; and Henry, Bishop of Winchester.

In the absence of male issue to Henry I of England, William was the eldest legitimate grandson of William the Conqueror. He would thus have been the principal rival to Henry's daughter Matilda to inherit the throne after Henry's death. However, William was not considered as a candidate for the English crown. Several historians have taken the view that he was passed over because of mental deficiency; hence his soubriquet "William the Simple". Though widely argued, this has never been clearly substantiated. 

William was at first groomed to inherit the comital thrones of Blois and Chartres, and was designated count shortly before his father's departure on his second crusade in 1102. During his mother's dispute with the Chartres cathedral chapter (1102–1104), William burst in the cathedral demanding the burghers of Chartres take an oath to kill the canons, harass Ivo of Chartres, and secure episcopal lands.  

William was soon removed from wide-ranging comital duties by his mother, and when her second son Theobald came of age, around 1107, Adela elevated him to the position of Count of Blois-Chartres. William retired to his wife's lands in Sully. Despite his removal from comital duties, he supported his brother Theobald's familial ambitions.

Marriage
On 13 November 1104, William married Agnes of Sully, heiress to the lordship of Sully-sur-Loire, chosen as his wife by his mother, Adela.

Children of Agnes and William:
Eudes Archambaud
Ranier (Rodolphus), Prior of La Charité-sur-Loire, Abbot of Cluny
Margaret (c. 1105–1145). She married Henry I, Count of Eu, about 1122.
Henry, Abbot of Fécamp, Bishop-designate of Salisbury, and Archbishop-elect of York
Elizabeth (died 1128), Abbess of Sainte-Trinité

Notes

References

Sources
 

 

 

Counts of Blois
Counts of Chartres
Lords of Sully
House of Sully
1080s births
1150 deaths
House of Blois